The Citharidae or largescale flounders are a small family of flounders with four genera. Three genera are restricted to the Indo-Pacific, while Citharus is from the Mediterranean and East Atlantic (off northwest Africa). There are a total of seven species.

Taxa include:

Subfamily Brachypleurinae
Genus Brachypleura
Brachypleura novaezeelandiae – yellow-dabbled flounder
Genus Lepidoblepharon
Lepidoblepharon ophthalmolepis – scale-eyed flounder
Subfamily Citharinae
Genus Citharoides
Citharoides axillaris
Citharoides macrolepidotus – branched ray flounder
Citharoides macrolepis – twospot largescale flounder
Citharoides orbitalis
Genus Citharus
Citharus linguatula – spotted flounder

References 
 Joseph S. Nelson: Fishes of the World. John Wiley & Sons, 2006, .

External links 
 

Pleuronectiformes
Marine fish families
Taxa named by Albert Günther